Zhuang Yunkuan (1867–1932), courtesy name Sijian, art name Baohong, was a Chinese calligrapher and Qing dynasty and Republic of China politician. He was born in Wujin County, Changzhou Prefecture, Jiangsu (modern Wujin District, Changzhou). He was prefect of Pingnan County, Guangxi, Sicheng (in Lingyun County) and Wuzhou. He was a delegate to the conference to create a provisional constitution for the Republic of China. In 1925, he served on the board of directors for the National Palace Museum.

Relatives
Wu Zuguang: grandnephew

References

1867 births
1932 deaths
Military governors of Jiangsu
Republic of China politicians from Jiangsu
Qing dynasty calligraphers
People from Wujin District
National Palace Museum
Politicians from Changzhou
Republic of China calligraphers
Artists from Changzhou
Qing dynasty politicians from Jiangsu